The Kambileyevka is a river of North Ossetia–Alania in southwestern Russia. It is a right tributary of the Terek.

References

Rivers of North Ossetia–Alania